Monsoma is a genus of common sawflies in the family Tenthredinidae. There are at least two described species in Monsoma.

Species
Species include:
 Monsoma pallipes Matsumura, 1912 g
 Monsoma pulveratum (Retzius, 1783) g b (green alder sawfly)
Data sources: i = ITIS, c = Catalogue of Life, g = GBIF, b = Bugguide.net

References

Further reading

External links

 

Tenthredinidae